Jean Joseph Kluger (born 31 March 1937) is a Belgian record producer, music publisher and composer.

Biography
Jean Kluger was born in Antwerp, Belgium, the eldest son of Jacques and Adela Kluger. His career started in 1957, working for his father's company, World Music.   He established his own company, Editions Jean Kluger, after the death of his father in 1963, and in 1965 moved to Paris where he established the company Bleu Blanc Rouge with his wife Huguette Ferly.

He wrote widely for the French, Flemish and international pop music markets, including songs for Sheila, Rika Zaraï, Nana Mouskouri, Petula Clark, Sacha Distel, Ringo, Dalida and Claude François. He also produced many Flemish artists such as Will Tura, Johan Verminnen, John Terra, Marva, and Dana Winner.   With Claude Bolling, he established the girl group , and published 50 of the songs they recorded.  He produced the cult album Le Monde Fabuleux Des Yamasuki, including the track "Aieaoa", later recorded by Bananarama as "Aie a Mwana".   With Daniel Vangarde, he wrote all the hits of La Compagnie Creole, The Gibson Brothers and Ottawan, including the international hits "D.I.S.C.O." and "Hands Up (Give Me Your Heart)".

In 2016 he became president of the International Certificate for Piano Artists (ICPA).

References

Bibliography
Robert Wangermée, Pascale Vandervellen, Dictionnaire de La chanson. En Wallonie et à Bruxelles, Mardaga, 1995

External links 
 Jean Kluger website
 Discography at Discogs.com

1937 births
Belgian musicians
Belgian songwriters
Male songwriters
Belgian record producers
Living people
21st-century Belgian musicians
20th-century Belgian musicians
20th-century Belgian male musicians
21st-century male musicians